The United States Department of Justice War Division was a subdivision of the United States Department of Justice (DoJ) that was created on May 19, 1942 during World War II.

The purpose of the War Division was to combine several war-related activities spread across the Department. It consisted initially of the Special War Policies Unit, the Alien Property Unit, and the Alien Enemy Control Unit. The War Division later included the War Frauds Unit, which originated as the Economic Section of the Antitrust Division.

With the end of the war, the War Division was abolished on December 28, 1945.

References 

Defunct agencies of the United States government
History of the government of the United States
Venona project
World War II espionage
Politics of World War II
Agencies of the United States government during World War II
Department of Justice
Justice ministries
Government agencies established in 1942
United States Department of Justice
1942 establishments in the United States